Spanish is the most-widely spoken language in Ecuador, though great variations are present depending on several factors, the most important one being the geographical region where it is spoken. The three main regional variants are:
 Equatorial Pacific Spanish or Equatorial Coastal Spanish
 Andean Spanish
 Amazonic Spanish

Additionally to the characteristics described below, Ecuadorian Spanish shares many characteristics that are widespread in Spanish in the Americas.

Other sociolinguistic factors that influence in the way of speaking are the ethnic or social class of the speaker, and whether the speaker lives in an urban or rural area. Since the Coast and the Highlands are the most populous areas, these are the country's most widely used dialects, despite being quite different from each other. For instance, there are many idioms specific to each region or province, and others that are used and understood nationwide.

Pacific Coast 

This Spanish variant is classified within the Equatorial Spanish dialect, which extends from the south Pacific coastal Colombia to the northern coast of Peru, crossing the Ecuadorian seacoast. The influential linguistic center of this dialectal region is the port city of Guayaquil.

The most remarkable feature of this variant, is the aspiration of the letter "s" at the end of words or when preceded by another consonant, often being pronounced as a smooth English "h". Likewise, letter "j" is not pronounced as strongly as in other variants  but rather smoothly and aspirated . These features are shared with many coastal Latin American Spanish dialects along with Canary Islands.

Thus, this dialect set the phonemical axis of accentual-tonal transition throughout the American varieties of Spanish, which extends geographically from the northern semi-low intonation of Central American and the Caribbean dialects (since only the European variants of Spanish are  particularly low-pitched) to the sharp high intonation characteristic of the lands located south, typical of Peru, Chile, and Argentina.

Therefore, the variant of Spanish spoken in the Ecuadorian coast and its neighboring western Andean plains, shares many features of both Caribbean dialects of northern Colombia and Venezuela, as well as some southern features of the Peruvian seaboard, making identification of this dialect very difficult to the ears of an outsider.  

In addition, this variant has incorporated into its lexicon a number of foreign words as well as words shared with other dialects of Ecuador which are understood only within the country. These words come mostly from the Andean Spanish dialects of Ecuador, with strong influences from Quichua (Northern Quechua), although Quechua had no historical presence in the Ecuadorian coast. This is the case of the Quechua-origin word "ñaño" (brother) which is widespread throughout the country.

 Guayaquil accent: One of the most outstanding accents of the region is the one from the city of Guayaquil, the largest city in the country. Being an important large city that has grown demographically through immigration, both national and international, many dialectal variations may be found mainly associated with social class, ethnicity, race and schooling. In general, the "s" sound is dropped or aspirated when it is at the end of the syllables while women tend to overpronounce the letter "s"  by saying a deaf elongated sound, especially in the beginning of the syllables. Among the higher-schooled classes, the tendency is to correct the accent towards a more standard Spanish, as well as to incorporate foreign words -especially from English- into its lexicon. Amongst the lower-schooled people, other variations may be found. There is a group of people who tend to share their intonation with the coastal farmers (known as "montubio"). Another group of people tend to have a stronger intonation, which is generally known as "street language" featured by pronouncing letter "s" as an English "sh" , in addition to a series of words in their lexicon that are not always understood by other speakers in the region. In some populations there is a notable sing-songy rhythm and intonation similar to Venezuelan Spanish and Rioplatense Spanish that reflects the late 20th century of Southern Italians settling in coastal cities like Guayaquil.
Montubio accent:  This the dialect spoken by the local peasants of the rural areas of the Guayas, Los Rios and Manabi provinces, known as montubio. They tend to emphasize the first syllable of most words  and to pronounce both the "s" and the "z" like the sound  (like th in think). This phonological type is called ceceo which is also common in some Andalusian Spanish dialects; while some montubios do not pronounce the "s" at all at the end of the words.
Esmeraldas accent: The province of Esmeraldas, on the other hand, presents a very different variant noticeable to the rest of the region, with a strong African component, which closely resembles the accent spoken in the bordering coastal region of Colombia (known there as "Chocoano" dialect). Since this region has a majority of people of African origin, this dialect tends to be a little stronger, featuring both lexical and intonation differences.
Manabí accent: The accent spoken in the province of Manabí is somewhat similar to the dialect spoken in Guayaquil, though slight variations in intonation and lexicon make it distinct and easily identifiable as a separate variety within the Ecuadorian coastal dialect.

Other regions in the Coast tend to speak a very similar dialect to the one spoken in the city of Guayaquil, due to its influence, specially in urban areas. Slight local variations may be found, however.

Andes 
In the highlands of Ecuador, a variant of Spanish is spoken, often confused by foreigners with Chilango Spanish—the dialect spoken in Mexico City—due to its similarities. However, it can be subdivided in four dialects:

 Pastuso Spanish (spoken in the Carchi Province, at the border with Colombia and similar to the one spoken at the other side of the border, in the Colombian department of Nariño)
 Chota Valley dialect, spoken only amongst the people of African descent that live in this valley between the provinces of Imbabura and Carchi. It is a mix of the Highland Central dialect with African influences, and different from the accent spoken in the coastal province of Esmeraldas. The Chota dialect is phonetically a highlands variety, with only slightly higher rates of s-reduction than surrounding varieties. Final  is often lost in the Chota variety when it's not morphologically significant, as in the first person plural ending . The current Chota dialect has absorbed some popular Andean syntactic formations, including those typical of Spanish-Quechua bilinguals. The Chota dialect, especially among its older and least-educated speakers, manifests an occasional lack of grammatical agreement, changes to prepositional usage, and constructions typical of creolized Spanish. Normally redundant subject pronouns which would be dropped in other varieties are usually retained in Chotas, as in Esmeraldas and several other areas such as the Caribbean. The current dialect in Chotas offers a window into an earlier stage, when a dialect with more features of Bozal Spanish was widely spoken.
 Central Andean, the dialect spoken in Quito and most of the Highlands.
 Morlaco Spanish, the dialect spoken in the city of Cuenca and the surrounding areas (provinces of Azuay and Cañar). Its main feature is the "singing" accent they have, many syllables being stressed where they don't correspond. As in the native languages of the region, the phoneme  tends to be realized as a fricative trill , akin to the letter  in Czech. Plus, this zone has a lot of own idiomatic expressions not used elsewhere in the country.
 Southern Highlander, the one spoken in the province of Loja.  This variant is maybe the most neutral from the Highlands region, but with a special feature, known in Spanish as lleísmo (the ancient Castilian way of pronouncing   as opposed to the yeísmo that is widespread in the rest of the Spanish speaking world where the sounds for ll and y are pronounced as y ). For instance, the word "pollo" (chicken) would be pronounced akin to "polio".

The Spanish spoken in the Ecuadorian Andes tends to have many idioms borrowed from Quechua, the native language spoken by the indigenous from this region. Words such as ñaño (which is used by many to refer to brother or "bro", while ñaña would mean sister) or choclo (corn) are widely used by people of any ethnicity or social class in this area. 
Voseo (the substitution of the second-person pronoun tú for vos) is also very common in this region of the country, used only for informal conversations between friends or relatives.
Word-final  is often voiced to  before a vowel, in addition to voicing before voiced consonants (found also in other dialects).

Amazonian 

The Amazonian region has a variant similar to the Central Andean dialect, though there are little differences. For instance, the quijo population from the northern areas, use the 2nd pronoun tú but conjugate the following verb with the 3rd person,  usted.

Galapagos Islands 

At the islands, a dialect very similar to the one from Guayaquil is spoken, with no major variations, since it is a very low-populated region if compared to the rest of the country.

Annex: Spanish Language
Annex: South American Spanish

References

Bibliography 
 

Spanish dialects of South America
Languages of Ecuador